De Cara al Viento is the ninth studio album recorded by Puerto Rican salsa singer Gilberto Santa Rosa released on November 22, 1994.

Track listing
This information adapted from Allmusic.

Chart performance

Certification

References

1994 albums
Gilberto Santa Rosa albums
Sony Discos albums